McBean is a surname.

McBean may refer to:
McBean, Georgia, U.S.
McBean Pound, South Australia
McBean Formation, a geologic formation in South Carolina, U.S.
Gladding, McBean, a ceramics company in Lincoln, California, U.S.
James McBean Residence, a house in Rochester, Minnesota, U.S. designed by Frank Lloyd Wright
McBean Cottage, historic cottage at Saranac Lake in Harrietstown, New York, U.S.
McBean, Trinidad and Tobago, a town in Trinidad

See also
Old Providence McBean Lagoon National Natural Park, Providencia Island, Colombia
Walter and McBean Galleries, San Francisco, U.S.